Dafydd Jones is a Welsh rugby union player.

Dafydd Jones may also refer to:

Dafydd Jones (footballer), Welsh footballer
Dafydd Jones (Dewi Dywyll), Welsh balladeer
Dafydd Glyn Jones, Welsh scholar and lexicographer
Dafydd Jones (Dafydd Jones o Drefriw) on List of Welsh-language authors
Dafydd Jones (Isfoel) on List of Welsh-language authors
Dafydd Jones (hymn writer) on List of Welsh-language authors
Dafydd Jones (hymnist) from Caio, Carmarthenshire
Dafydd Jones (poet) on List of Welsh-language authors

See also
David Jones (disambiguation)